The Zimbabwe national futsal team is controlled by the Zimbabwe Football Association, the governing body for futsal in Zimbabwe and represents the country in international futsal competitions.

Tournaments

FIFA Futsal World Cup
 1989 – 1st round
 1992 – Did not enter
 1996 – Did not qualify
 2000 – Did not enter
 2004 – Did not enter
 2008 – Did not enter
 2012 – Did not qualify
 2016 – Did not enter
 2020 – To be determined

Africa Futsal Cup of Nations
1996 –  Third Place
2000 – Did not qualify
2004 – Did not qualify
2008 – Did not qualify
2011 – Cancelled
2016 – Did not enter

References

Zimbabwe
Futsal
Futsal in Zimbabwe